The Khanty are an indigenous people living in Khanty-Mansi Autonomous Okrug, Russia.

Khanty may also refer to:
 Khanty language, the language of the Khanty peoples
 Khanty Ocean, an ancient, small ocean that existed near the end of the Precambrian time to the Silurian

See also
 Khanty–Mansi Autonomous Okrug, a federal subject of Russia
 Khanty-Mansiysk, an oil boom town and the administrative center of Khanty-Mansi Autonomous Okrug
 Ostyak, name formerly used to refer to several peoples, including the Khanty people